Maxim Sergeyevich Afinogenov (born September 4, 1979) is a Russian former professional ice hockey player. Known for his skating speed, he was drafted by the National Hockey League (NHL)'s Buffalo Sabres in the third round, 69th overall, in 1997 and played nine seasons with the club. He then played one season with the Atlanta Thrashers before signing and finishing his career in the Kontinental Hockey League (KHL).

Personal life
Afinogenov was first introduced to hockey by his dad when he was five years old. As a youth, he played in the 1993 Quebec International Pee-Wee Hockey Tournament with a team from Moscow.

He married Russian former professional tennis player, Elena Dementieva on July 16, 2011. His sister Katia Afinogenov married current Carolina Hurricanes left winger Max Pacioretty one week later.

Playing career

Buffalo Sabres
Afinogenov was a forward for Dynamo Moscow of the Russian Superleague (RSL) for four seasons. He was drafted 69th overall by the Buffalo Sabres in the 1997 NHL Entry Draft and played his rookie NHL season in 1999–2000, scoring 34 points in 65 games, while also playing in 15 games with the Sabres' American Hockey League (AHL) affiliate, the Rochester Americans. Following his third season with the Sabres, a 21-goal, 40-point campaign in 2001–02, Afinogenov re-signed with a two-year, $2.4 million contract on September 4, 2002. However, that same day, while playing a pickup game in Moscow, he took a puck to the head, suffering a concussion. He was limited to just 35 games in the subsequent season, managing just 11 points. The next season, in 2003–04, he recorded his first career hat-trick on December 31, 2003, at HSBC Arena in a 7–1 win against the Washington Capitals. He finished the season bouncing back from his previous concussion-riddled season with 17 goals and 31 points.

After spending the 2004–05 season back in Russia with Dynamo Moscow due to the NHL lockout, Afinogenov recorded his best season to date when NHL play resumed in 2005–06 with personal bests of 51 assists and 73 points. As the Sabres embarked on a playoff run to the Conference Finals, where they were defeated in seven games by the eventual Stanley Cup champion Carolina Hurricanes. Afinogenov added eight points in 18 post-season games. He continued his scoring pace the following season in 2006–07 and, despite missing 26 games, scored 61 points and a career-high 23 goals. During the season, Sabres backup goalie Martin Biron was traded to the Philadelphia Flyers at the trade deadline in February 2007, making Afinogenov the longest-serving Sabre on the roster. His production tailed off in 2007–08, however, managing just 28 points in the same number of games as the previous season.

Atlanta Thrashers
Following the 2008–09 season, in which he was sidelined once more with a groin injury, Afinogenov became an unrestricted free agent and was not re-signed by the Sabres. He left the club as the longest-serving Sabre on the previous season's roster, having played for the club since his rookie season in 1999–2000. On September 17, 2009, the Atlanta Thrashers invited Afinogenov to their 2009–10 training camp on a tryout. and on September 29, 2009, he signed a one-year contract with the team worth $800,000. He scored his first goal as a Thrasher on October 17, 2009, against the Buffalo Sabres. He finished the season finishing second on the team in points, behind only Nik Antropov.

KHL
Following the 2009–10 season, Afinogenov signed a five-year deal with SKA Saint Petersburg in the Kontinental Hockey League (KHL) as a free agent. After a productive first season with St. Petersburg, Afinogenov was plagued by injury in the following two seasons. He was traded to Podolsk-based HC Vityaz prior to the 2013–14 season and was announced as the team's captain.

Career statistics

Regular season and playoffs

International

References

External links
 

1979 births
Living people
Atlanta Thrashers players
Buffalo Sabres draft picks
Buffalo Sabres players
HC Dynamo Moscow players
HC Vityaz players
Ice hockey people from Moscow
Ice hockey players at the 2002 Winter Olympics
Ice hockey players at the 2006 Winter Olympics
Ice hockey players at the 2010 Winter Olympics
Medalists at the 2002 Winter Olympics
Olympic bronze medalists for Russia
Olympic ice hockey players of Russia
Olympic medalists in ice hockey
Rochester Americans players
Russian expatriate ice hockey people
Russian expatriate sportspeople in the United States
Russian ice hockey right wingers
SKA Saint Petersburg players